Monte Fontainhas is a volcanic mountain in the middle of Brava island in Cape Verde. At 976 m elevation, it is the highest point of the island. Rock types are made up of phonolite and ignimbrite. The mountainous centre of the island is often covered with clouds, which feed numerous springs, as was already observed by the 19th century traveller Armand d'Avezac.

See also
List of mountains in Cape Verde

References

Fontainhas
Geography of Brava, Cape Verde